Abad (also Romanized as Ābād) is a village in Sardasht Rural District, Zeydun District, Behbahan County, Khuzestan Province, Iran. At the 2006 census, its population was 201, in 40 families.

References 

Populated places in Behbahan County